"Do-It-Yourself Mr. Bean" is the ninth episode of the British television series Mr. Bean, produced by Tiger Aspect Productions and Thames Television for Central Independent Television. It was first broadcast on ITV on 10 January 1994 and was watched by 15.60 million viewers during its original transmission.

Plot

Act 1: New Year's Eve Party 
It's New Year's Eve of 1993 and Mr. Bean is excited. He has invited his two best friends Rupert and Hubert over to his flat for a New Year party and is putting the finishing touches on his decorations, which aren't much (a circle of chairs in the living room and a bunch of balloons hanging from the front door). Rupert and Hubert arrive, but they realize that it's not really the party they were expecting: Bean gives his guests party hats made of newspaper, assigns them designated chairs, and the only form of entertainment is a radio. Bean then goes to the kitchen to prepare refreshments. However, he finds he has almost run out of Twiglets, and so improvises by chopping up a branch outside his kitchen window with a butcher knife and dipping the twigs in Marmite in an attempt to disguise them. He then opens a bottle of Champagne, but discovers that there is only enough to fill half a glass. Bean improvises again by using a bottle of vinegar and adding sugar to sweeten it.

As the night goes on, it becomes apparent that Rupert and Hubert are not having a good time. They've uncovered that the "food" they've been given isn't genuine and refuse to eat it, despite Bean eating his and pretending to like the vinegar. Bean then heads back to the kitchen and takes peanuts from a bird feeder outside and pours them onto a plate. Meanwhile, Rupert and Hubert turn the clock in the living room to just before midnight. When Bean comes back, the clock chimes midnight. They then link hands (almost forgetting Teddy) and sing "Auld Lang Syne" to celebrate. Rupert and Hubert then feign yawning and claim that they are tired, so Bean puts the doorknob back on his door (for some reason he had taken it off and put it into a fruit bowl; this is a running gag throughout the episode) and bids them goodnight. Right outside the door, Rupert and Hubert come across two women who laugh at their paper hats before heading into the neighbor's flat, where a swinging New Year's party is underway. They then ponder whether to leave or go into the party, ultimately choosing the latter.

Meanwhile, Bean is in bed and puts Teddy next to him before turning off the light and going to sleep. However, he hears the countdown process at the party across from him as well as everyone singing "Auld Lang Syne", indicating the real New Year has started. Confused, he turns the light back on and takes a small clock out of his chest of drawers, which indicates that it's just past midnight (at this point, the clock in the living room shows 1:40). He is angered when he finds out that Rupert and Hubert deceived him and attended the larger party next door, before switching off the light and going back to sleep.

Act 2: The Department Store Sale 

On New Year's Day, Bean drives to the Arding & Hobbs department store in order to take full advantage of the January sales. Bean manages to jump the queue by revealing that the "person" at the front was a dummy which he had placed previously. Bean purchases many items, including the armchair that was on display in the window. Unable to fit all his purchases and himself in his Mini, Bean decides to drive it from the armchair atop the roof, using ropes to operate the steering wheel and a broom to operate the pedals. All goes well until Bean is diverted on a steep downhill street. When he loses the head of the broom trying to operate the brakes, he resorts to driving the Mini into the back of a lorry delivering mattresses.

Act 3: Painting with Fireworks 
Back at the flat, Bean begins to redecorate with the new items he bought. He first realizes that moving the table from in front of the hole in the kitchen wall is impractical, as he can no longer place objects on it through the hole while he is in the kitchen. His solution: just move the hole. After getting exact measurements using three pencils (one in his mouth and one in each hand), he uses a reciprocating saw to cut out a section of the wall before moving it into the original hole. However, he is oblivious to what is on the opposite side of the wall, and cuts through a telephone cable and several pictures (including decapitating one of Prince Charles, Princess Diana, and a picture of a body builder near the groin area) in the process.

He then begins to paint the whole living room, but finds that the bristles on his paintbrush are dried solid, and they soon fall into the paint can. In a cruel improvisation, he shoves the brush handle into Teddy's rear and uses his head to paint the walls. However, he manages to only get a few lines of paint done before accidentally dripping paint onto things. Bean then realizes a more efficient way of painting the wall. He carefully covers everything in the living room and kitchen in newspaper and, when he runs out of newspaper to cover his clock, uses the hat Hubert left behind. Bean then places a large firecracker in the paint can, ignites the fuse and runs out of the flat. At that moment, a tired and hungover Hubert stumbles out of the neighbor's flat and realizes he left his hat in Bean's flat, and goes in to retrieve it just as the firecracker explodes. Bean returns to his flat and is satisfied that his paint bomb worked. However, he is shocked to discover white footprints of Hubert from his front door, and a silhouette of Hubert fetching his hat is frozen onto a section of wall as the only unpainted area.

Deleted scene 
The following scene was originally cut from the episode in the middle of Act 2, although it was included in early United States VHS releases.

Mr. Bean is shopping in the department store, when he sees a chair that he wishes to purchase. Upon approaching the reclining chair, he discovers that a sales assistant is already demonstrating its features to an elderly couple. When Bean realizes that the couple wants to take the chair, Bean find the ways of fooling them into thinking it's broken: he unplugs it, which is almost immediately noticed by the assistant.

While the elderly woman is enjoyably sitting on the chair, Bean then sneaks up to a control panel on the chair's arm and tampers with the wires inside, unknown to the elderly woman. As the elderly woman tries out the reclining feature this time, it folds over, sandwiching her in the middle; she yells to her hearing-impaired husband for help but is unheard, despite being only a couple of metres away. In addition, Bean turns up the music playing on the store's intercom, to make it harder for her to be heard. Ultimately, she falls backwards.

Cast
Rowan Atkinson as Mr. Bean
Simon Godley as Rupert
Helen Burns as the woman on the narrow sofa
David Stoll (uncredited)
Rupert Vansittart as Police Officer and Hubert
Andy Greenhalgh (uncredited)
Robert Austin

Production 
Location scenes were recorded on ENG videotape at Arding & Hobbs (run at the time as an Allders department store) in Battersea. Studio sequences were recorded at Teddington Studios, although for safety reasons, part of Act 3 was filmed without a live audience. It was also the first episode produced by Tiger Aspect founder Peter Bennett-Jones.

During its second transmission, the episode was watched by 12.96 million viewers, outrating the final two episodes of the series. Along with "Mr. Bean in Room 426", this episode has never been repeated on Nickelodeon UK because of scenes of nudity.

Deleted scene
An extended scene where Mr. Bean is shopping at the department store for the January sales, when he sees a chair that he wishes to purchase. Upon approaching the reclining chair, he discovers that a sales assistant is already demonstrating its features to an elderly couple, prompting Bean to try fooling them into thinking it's broken: he unplugs it, which is almost immediately noticed by the assistant. While the elderly woman enjoys the chair, Bean secretly tampers with wires in its control panel. As she tries out the reclining feature, it folds over and sandwiches her in the middle. As she yells to her hearing-impaired husband for help (but is unheard despite being only a couple of metres away). Bean turns up the music playing on the store's intercom to make it harder for her to be heard, and she ultimately falls backward.

Legacy 
MythBusters tested the idea of painting with explosives in Mind Control after being inspired by a rerun of the episode. They first ran tests to see if it was really possible to cover an entire room with paint by exploding a firework in a paint can, but the method was proven impossible by the test.

In a later revisit in Painting with Explosives/Bifurcated Boat, Jamie Hyneman's twist on Mr. Bean's technique using a steel sphere was also busted while Adam Savage's snowflake frame twist on the idea worked, but not well enough to be either busted, confirmed or judged plausible.

The scene Act 2 where Bean uses a brick attached by some string to hold his car and releases the emergency brake was later reused in the episode "In the Pink" from Mr. Bean: The Animated Series where Bean uses the technique in order to arrest the thieves.
 
In 2009, Rowan Atkinson appeared as Mr. Bean during the Goodwood Revival driving a recreation of the car stunt as part of Goodwood's celebration of 50 years of the Mini.

In 2015, a recreation of the car stunt scene was staged in central London to promote the 25th anniversary of the series, ending with a photo call outside Buckingham Palace.

References

External links 
 

Mr. Bean episodes
New Year television episodes
1994 British television episodes
Fiction set in 1993
Fiction set in 1994
Television shows written by Rowan Atkinson
Television shows written by Robin Driscoll